"You" is a song by American singer Romeo Santos from his debut studio album Fórmula, Vol. 1 (2011). Produced by Santos, the track was released as the album's first single in Latin America and the United States.

The song, named a promising start for the former member of Aventura, combines elements of bachata and R&B and debuted atop the Billboards Latin Songs chart, with Santos becoming the eighth performer in the history of the chart to start at this position.

Background
Romeo Santos was the lead member of Aventura, an urban and bachata infused band, which sold 1.7 million albums in the United States and had the best-selling Latin album of 2009 The Last. After the band's temporary separation, Santos was announced as the star of an upcoming comedy series to be premiered on ABC. The series will deal with the struggle of a Dominican American fighting his beliefs to success in the United States and will be Santos debut acting job. Following the announcement, Santos signed a record deal with Sony Music Entertainment and recorded his debut studio album, Formula, Vol. 1, which includes most of the tracks in bachata rhythm and bilingual songs such as the lead single "You" and "Promise", featuring Usher.

Chart performance
"You" was selected as the lead single from the album and released to airplay on May 9, 2011. The song debuted at number-one in the Billboard Hot Latin Songs chart in the week of May 28, 2011, with Santos becoming the eighth performer to start the top position of the chart following Juanes, Juan Gabriel, Enrique Iglesias, Marco Antonio Solís, Los Temerarios, Ricky Martin and Maná. "You" spent seven weeks at this position, which was named a promising start by Carlos Quintana of About.com, stating that the song combines elements of bachata and R&B as was the characteristic sound of Santos' band Aventura.

Charts

Weekly charts

Year-end charts

Certifications

Track listing and formats
Digital download
"You" – 4:08

See also
 List of number-one Billboard Hot Tropical Songs of 2011
 List of number-one Billboard Top Latin Songs of 2011

References

2011 singles
Romeo Santos songs
Macaronic songs
Spanglish songs
Songs written by Romeo Santos
Sony Music Latin singles